The John Bates Clark Medal is awarded by the American Economic Association to "that American economist under the age of forty who is adjudged to have made a significant contribution to economic thought and knowledge." The award is named after the American economist John Bates Clark (1847–1938).

According to The Chronicle of Higher Education, it "is widely regarded as one of the field's most prestigious awards... second only to the Nobel Memorial Prize in Economic Sciences." Many of the recipients went on to receive the Nobel Prizes in their later careers, including the inaugural recipient Paul Samuelson. The award was made biennially until 2007, but from 2009 is now awarded every year because of the growth of the field. Although the Clark medal is billed as a prize for American economists, it is sufficient that the candidates work in the US at the time of the award; US nationality is not necessary to be considered.

Past recipients

See also 

 List of economics awards
 Yrjö Jahnsson Foundation
 Nakahara Prize
 Gossen Prize
 Fields Medal
 Bernácer Prize
 Elaine Bennett Research Prize
 Prix du meilleur jeune économiste de France

References

External links 
John Bates Clark Medal at American Economic Association website

American Economic Association
Awards with age limits
Economics awards